KNOG (91.7 FM) is a radio station broadcasting a Spanish language Christian format. It is licensed to Nogales, Arizona.  The station is currently owned by World Radio Network, Inc.

The call letters KNOG previously were issued to an AM station in Nogales on 1340 kHz that operated between 1948 and 1965.

From 1974 until March 20, 1985, the call letters, KNOG were issued to a college radio station. This was Northern Montana College (now MSU-Northern) located in Havre Montana. The call letters were changed to KNMC

FM translators
The following FM translators are authorized to rebroadcast KNOG.

References

External links

Radio stations established in 1995
Nogales, Arizona
NOG
NOG